Ralph E. Norwood (January 23, 1966 – November 24, 1989) was an American football offensive tackle in the National Football League. He played 11 games with the Atlanta Falcons in 1989. He was killed in an automobile accident.

Norwood was born in New Orleans, Louisiana to Roy and Elaine Norwood. Norwood was a talented football player, standing 6 ft 7in tall and weighing over 200 lbs in high school, he was formidable on the line. After graduation, he attended LSU and was redshirted his freshman year. He was selected by the Atlanta Falcons in the second round of the 1989 NFL Draft. 

Norwood died in a one-car accident on November 24, 1989. Norwood was alone in his car when he crossed over a lane of oncoming traffic, traveled down an embankment and struck a tree. Drugs and alcohol were not found to be factors in the accident. Norwood died eleven games into the 1989 season; he had played in each game and started one game.

The year before Norwood's death, Falcons cornerback David Croudip died of a cocaine overdose. After Norwood's death, Falcons player Mike Kenn commented on the two losses, saying, "There's not a whole lot you can say about this. Once is too much, twice is ridiculous." Less than four weeks after Norwood's accident, Falcons tight end Brad Beckman died when he apparently fell asleep while driving on any icy highway, striking a tree.

References

External links
Deaths in football

1966 births
1989 deaths
Players of American football from New Orleans
American football offensive tackles
LSU Tigers football players
Atlanta Falcons players
Road incident deaths in Georgia (U.S. state)